is a Japanese football player. He plays for Fukushima United FC.

Career
From 2013, Go Ito joined Montenegrin club Zora, Kom and Iskra Danilovgrad. In 2015, he moved to Bosnian club Zvijezda Gradačac. In July, he went back to Japan and joined J1 League club Shonan Bellmare. In June 2017, he moved to J3 League club Fukushima United FC.

Club statistics
Updated to 31 January 2018.

References

External links

 Profile at Fukushima United FC

1994 births
Living people
Nihon University alumni
Association football people from Saitama Prefecture
Japanese footballers
J1 League players
J2 League players
J3 League players
Shonan Bellmare players
Fukushima United FC players
Association football goalkeepers